Stintino is a coastal comune (municipality) in the Province of Sassari in the Italian region Sardinia, located about  north of Cagliari and about  northwest of Sassari.

Geography

Stintino is located on the peninsula of the same name, running from Nurra plain  to  the Asinara Island, part of the Asinara National Park, for which Stintino is the nearer embarkment place. The municipality borders with Sassari and its northernmost point, a cape in which is located the town, is in front of the Asinara, who belongs to the municipality of Porto Torres.

History
Stintino was a frazione of the comune of Sassari until 1988.

Tourism
It is a popular seaside resort and is provided with three tourist ports: Porto Mannu (with 305 boat places), Marina di Stintino (160 boat places) and Porto Minore (110 boat places).

References

External links

 Tourism in the Gulf of Asinara
 Stintino Guide
 Web Stintino
 Porto Mannu

Cities and towns in Sardinia
States and territories established in 1988
1988 establishments in Italy